Eupithecia prasinombra is a moth of the family Geometridae. It was first described by Edward Meyrick in 1899. It is endemic to the Hawaiian island of Maui.

References

External links

Moths described in 1899
prasinombra
Endemic moths of Hawaii